Ghayoor Ali Khan (7 October 1909 – 7 April 1989) was an Indian politician. He is a Member of Parliament from Muzaffarnagar. He was a member of Janata Party (Secular), while in office in 1980.

Khan died in New Delhi on 7 April 1989, at the age of 79.

References 

1909 births
1989 deaths
Janata Party (Secular) politicians
Lok Sabha members from Uttar Pradesh